Anything Goes is a 1936 American musical film directed by Lewis Milestone and starring Bing Crosby, Ethel Merman, Charles Ruggles and Ida Lupino. Based on the 1934 stage musical Anything Goes by Guy Bolton and P. G. Wodehouse, the stage version contains songs by Cole Porter.

The film required revisions of Porter's saucy lyrics to pass Production Code censors. Only four of his songs remained: "Anything Goes", "I Get a Kick Out of You", "There'll Always Be a Lady Fair", and "You're the Top". "You're the Top" contained substantially revised lyrics, and only the first line (sung by Ethel Merman during the opening credits) was retained from the song "Anything Goes".

Bing Crosby's influence was used to gut most of Porter's score and obtain four new songs from several new songwriters, Richard A. Whiting, Hoagy Carmichael, Leo Robin, Edward Heyman, and Friedrich Hollander, but other than "Moonburn", written by Hoagy Carmichael and Edward Heyman, which temporarily became a hit for Crosby,  it is usually agreed  that most of the replacement score was forgettable. Some, including movie musical expert John Springer, have criticized Paramount for substituting new songs by other composers for the originals. (This was a common policy in Hollywood during the 1930s, when film studios owned music publishing houses and hoped that songs written especially for films would guarantee extra profits for the studio.)

When Paramount sold the 1936 film to television, they retitled the movie Tops is the Limit because the 1956 film version, also from Paramount, was currently in theaters.

Plot
A young man falls in love with a beautiful woman whom he follows onto a luxury liner, where he discovers she is an English heiress who ran away from home and is now being returned to England. He also discovers that his boss is on the ship. To avoid discovery, he disguises himself as the gangster accomplice of a minister, who is actually a gangster on the run from the law.

Cast
 Bing Crosby as Billy Crocker
 Ethel Merman as Reno Sweeney
 Charles Ruggles as Rev. Dr. Moon
 Ida Lupino as Hope Harcourt
 Grace Bradley as Bonnie LeTour
 Arthur Treacher as Sir Evelyn Oakleigh
 Robert McWade as Elisha J. Whitney
 Richard Carle as Bishop Dobson
 Margaret Dumont as Mrs. Wentworth
 Jerry Tucker as Junior
 Matt Moore as Capt. McPhail
 Edward Gargan as Detective
 Matt McHugh as Detective
 Budd Fine as Pug-Ugly
 Jack Mulhall as Ship's Purser
 Jack Norton as Drunken passenger
 The Avalon Boys as Quartet

Production credits
 Lewis Milestone - director
 Benjamin Glazer - producer
 Cole Porter - music and lyrics
 Karl Struss - photography
 Lindsay and Crouse - screenplay
 LeRoy Prinz - staging of dance ensembles
 Farciot Edouart - special photographic effects
 Hans Dreier - art direction
 Ernst Fegté - art direction
 Eda Warren - editor
 Jack Goodrich - sound recording
 Don Johnson - sound recording
 Travis Banton - costume design
 A. E. Freudman - interior decorations
 Vinton Freedley - production advisor

Soundtrack
"Anything Goes" sung by Ethel Merman
"You're the Top" sung by Bing Crosby and Ethel Merman
"I Get a Kick out of You" sung by Ethel Merman
"There'll Always Be a Lady Fair" (Cole Porter) sung by the Avalon Boys and Bing Crosby
"My Heart and I" (Frederick Hollander/ Leo Robin) sung by Bing Crosby
"Sailor Beware" (Richard Whiting / Leo Robin) sung by Bing Crosby
"Moonburn" sung by Bing Crosby
"Shanghai-De-Ho" (Frederick Hollander/ Leo Robin) sung by Bing Crosby and Ethel Merman

Crosby recorded three of the new songs for Decca Records. and they were also included in the Bing's Hollywood series.

Reception
The New York Times wrote "Paramount uncorked its pent-up version of Anything Goes at the Paramount Theatre yesterday and instead of an exuberant pop and a merry fizz, there was merely a gentle sigh...Bing Crosby is an acceptable substitute for the show’s William Gaxton in almost every subdivision except that in which he joins Miss Merman in “You’re The Top”. It doesn’t seem possible but Mr. Crosby croons it."

Variety wrote "Cole Porter’s lyrics, which were the original essence and chief asset of the original stage Anything Goes have been sacrificed for and replaced by plot motion in this Paramount film adaptation...Ethel Merman comes from the original cast and her job in the picture equals her job in the stage version, which means aces. Crosby in the Billy Gaxton juve lead makes it more important than the latter did, because of the extra territory taken in by his singing...As directed by Lewis Milestone everything moves along swiftly. On the whole, as screen entertainment and as musical adaptation, Par’s ‘Goes’ will do."

Writing for The Spectator in 1936, Graham Greene gave the film a poor review, specifically criticizing Bing Crosby's slow and "moony methods" of singing in "a picture which should rattle quite as fast as a sub-machine gun". Greene found that the song "You're the Top" had been "murdered".

References 

Green, Stanley (1999) Hollywood Musicals Year by Year (2nd ed.), pub. Hal Leonard Corporation  page 52

Further reading

External links
 

1936 films
1936 musical films
American black-and-white films
Films scored by Cole Porter
Films based on musicals
Films based on works by P. G. Wodehouse
Films directed by Lewis Milestone
Paramount Pictures films
American musical films
1930s English-language films
1930s American films